Henrik Jørgensen may refer to:

 Henrik Jørgensen (runner) (1961–2019), Danish marathon runner
 Henrik Jørgensen (footballer) (born 1966), Danish former footballer
 Henrik Jorgensen (Paralympian) (fl. 1980s), Danish Paralympic track & field and boccia athlete